The Live Earth concert in China was held at Oriental Pearl Tower, Shanghai on 7 July 2007.

Running order
Evonne Hsu - "Love on July 7", "Lost in Venice", "I" (SH 11:36)
Anthony Wong - "The Little Prince", "The Season", "Venus" (SH 12:06)
Soler - "Not Along", "Fiona's Song", "Lead", "Hey Ma" (SH 12:46)
Huang Xiao Ming - "Secret Love", "My Girl" (SH 13:16)
12 Girls Band - "Jasmin", "The New Classics", "Glory" (SH 13:46)
Joey Yung - "The Girl Waving Her Wings", "Renaissance of Love", "Little Little" (SH 14:16)
Winnie Hsin - "Have Been Loved", "The Reply for Love", "The Taste of Love" (SH 14:46)
Sarah Brightman - "Nessun Dorma", "Time to Say Goodbye", "La Luna" (SH 15:26)
Wang Xiao Kun (王啸坤) (SH 15:56)
Eason Chan - "The Floating City", "Squander", "Happy Boy" (SH 16:36)
Wang Rui (王睿) & Wang Chuan Jun (王传君) - "手牵手" ("Hand in Hand") (SH 17:06)
Pu Ba Jia (蒲巴甲) (SH 17:36)

Coverage

Online
MSN was responsible for the online broadcasting of the concert.

References

External links
Official Live Earth Web Site
MSN Live Earth Site
Official Live Earth blog

Shanghai
Rock festivals in China
2007 in China
Music festivals in China
2000s in Shanghai
Environmentalism in China